David M.R. Jackson is a professor at the University of Waterloo in the department of combinatorics and optimization. He graduated from Cambridge University in 1969. Jackson has been responsible for many developments in enumerative combinatorics in his career, as well as being a mathematical consultant to the Oxford English Dictionary Project.

He is a Fellow of the Royal Society of Canada and a Member of the Academy of Mathematical and Physical Sciences.

With Ian Goulden, Jackson published the book Combinatorial Enumeration.

Selected publications

See also
 List of University of Waterloo people

References

External links
 

Year of birth missing (living people)
Living people
Canadian mathematicians
Academic staff of the University of Waterloo
Alumni of the University of Cambridge